No. 159 Helicopter Unit is a Helicopter Unit and is equipped with Mil Mi-17V5 and based at Purnea AFS.

History

Assignments

Aircraft
Mil Mi-17V5

References

159